is a Japanese surname. Notable people with the surname include:

Alicja Sakaguchi (born 1954), Polish linguist
Ango Sakaguchi (1906–1955), Japanese novelist and essayist
Anri Sakaguchi (born 1991), Japanese entertainer
Chikara Sakaguchi (born 1934), Japanese politician
Daisuke Sakaguchi (born 1973), Japanese voice actor
, Japanese swimmer
Hironobu Sakaguchi (born 1962), Japanese game designer, game director and game producer
Hiroyuki Sakaguchi (born 1965), Japanese baseball player
Kenji Sakaguchi (actor) (born 1975), Japanese actor
Kenji Sakaguchi (footballer) (born 1975), former Japanese football player
, Japanese model and actor
Kinichiro Sakaguchi ( 1897- 1994), Japanese agricultural chemist and microbiologist
Kōichi Sakaguchi, Japanese voice actor
Maki Sakaguchi (born 1989), Japanese field hockey player
, Japanese women's footballer
, Japanese women's footballer
, Japanese shogi player
Seiji Sakaguchi (born 1942), retired Japanese professional wrestler
Sena Sakaguchi (born 1999), Japanese racing driver
, Japanese immunologist
Shūhei Sakaguchi (born 1977), Japanese voice actor
Tak Sakaguchi (born 1975), Japanese actor, director, fight choreographer and stuntman
Yoshisada Sakaguchi (born 1939), Japanese actor and voice actor
Yukio Sakaguchi (born 1973), Japanese mixed martial artist and professional wrestler
Tsubasa Sakaguchi (阪口 翼, born 19??), Japanese game designer and director for Nintendo

Fictional characters
 Alice Sakaguchi, the main character from Please Save My Earth

See also
 10823 Sakaguchi, a main-belt asteroid
 Sakaguchi test, a chemical test

Japanese-language surnames